Dorothy Fowler is a writer who lives on Waiheke Island, New Zealand. In 2009, she published her first novel, What Remains Behind (Random House, 2009), an archaeological mystery set in the Kaipara region of New Zealand.

Life 
Fowler lives on Waiheke Island, a gulf island in the Auckland harbour. Prior to becoming a writer, she worked in a variety of jobs including building and boatbuilding, before returning to university as an adult student to study ancient history and archaeology. While completing her Bachelor of Arts in ancient history and archaeology at the University of Auckland, she needed one more paper to complete her degree, so she picked up a course in creative writing taken by acclaimed writer Witi Ihimaera, famous for writing Whale Rider.

Writing 
Fowler studied for a master's degree in Creative Writing, and was mentored by Witi Ihimaera, and award-winning New Zealand novelist Emily Perkins. She wrote the manuscript to her debut novel as part of her course assignment, a mystery based on an archeological dig set in Whakapirau. Fowler has described her taste in fiction as 'classic whodunnits'; Dorothy L. Sayers, Agatha Christie, Ngaio Marsh, and she used her recent archaeological research from her first degree to form the basis of the research for her first novel.

Novels 
 2009: What Remains Behind

Reviews 
"This novel contains an attractive mix of mystery, history, and archaeology... Dorothy Fowler has done well with her first book and I look forward to more." Ruth Gardner.

 "Fowler creates a nice sense of authenticity with the small-town setting, filled with the spider-web of shared histories, and secrets past or present, that can be prevalent in a place where everyone knows everyone (or at least presumes they do)... Overall, an enjoyable read and a promising debut from a new voice in New Zealand writing."  
Craig Sisterson, NZLawyer magazine

References

People from Auckland
Living people
New Zealand mystery writers
New Zealand crime fiction writers
New Zealand women novelists
University of Auckland alumni
People from Waiheke Island
Women mystery writers
21st-century New Zealand novelists
21st-century New Zealand writers
21st-century New Zealand women writers
Year of birth missing (living people)